A database machines or back end processor is a computer or special hardware that stores and retrieves data from a database. It is specially designed for database access and is tightly coupled to the main (front-end) computer(s) by a high-speed channel, whereas a database server is a general-purpose computer that holds a database and it's loosely coupled via a local area network to its clients.

Database machines can retrieve large amount of data using hundreds to thousands of microprocessors with database software. The front end processor asks the back end (typically sending a query expressed in a query language) the data and further processes it. The back end processor on the other hand analyzes and stores the data from the front end processor. Back end processors result in higher performance, increasing host main memory, increasing database recovery and security, and decreasing cost to manufacture.

Britton-Lee (IDM), Tandem (Non-Stop System), and Teradata (DBC) all offered early commercial specialized database machines. A more recent example was Oracle Exadata.

Criticism and suggested remedy
According to Julie McCann,

References

Further reading
 Berra, P. Bruce. “Data base machines.” SIGIR Forum 12, 3 (Winter 1977), 4–23. https://doi.org/10.1145/1095317.1095318
 Banerjee, Jayanta. “Data structuring and indexing for data base machines.” In Proceedings of the fifth workshop on Computer architecture for non-numeric processing (CAW '80). Association for Computing Machinery, New York, NY, USA, 11–16. https://doi.org/10.1145/800083.802687
 Song, Siang Wun. “A Survey and Taxonomy of Database Machines.” IEEE Database Eng. Bull. 4 (1981): 3-13.
 Hoffer, Jeffrey A.; Alexander, Mary B. “The diffusion of database machines.” SIGMIS Database 23, 2 (Spring 1992): 13–19. https://doi.org/10.1145/141342.141352

See also
 Content Addressable File Store (CAFS)

Classes of computers
Databases